The 	Old Classroom Building, Union College, located on College Street in Barbourville, Kentucky, is a historic building of Union College which was built in 1907.  It was listed on the National Register of Historic Places in 1975.

A university official, in its 1974 NRHP nomination, suggests: "The design of the building as a whole by an as yet unknown architect is of somewhat anomalous stylistic character (perhaps vaguely Italian Romanesque in flavor), unassuming, but well-proportioned, and exactly calculated to fulfill the role of landmark that it does."

See also 
 Speed Hall (1905)
 Soldiers and Sailors Memorial Gym (1919)

References

Union College (Kentucky)
National Register of Historic Places in Knox County, Kentucky
Buildings and structures completed in 1907
1907 establishments in Kentucky
University and college buildings on the National Register of Historic Places in Kentucky